Gustave Côté (17 October 1913 – 13 April 2001) was a Liberal party member of the House of Commons of Canada. He was born in Sainte-Claire, Quebec and became an engineer, industrial designer and industrialist by career.

He was elected at the Dorchester riding in the 1965 general election. After completing his only term, the 27th Canadian Parliament, Côté left Parliament and did not seek another term in federal office.

External links
 

1913 births
2001 deaths
Members of the House of Commons of Canada from Quebec
Liberal Party of Canada MPs